The 1984 Vuelta a España was the 39th edition of the Vuelta a España, one of cycling's Grand Tours. The Vuelta began in Jerez de la Frontera, with a prologue individual time trial on 17 April, and Stage 11 occurred on 28 April with a stage from Burgos. The race finished in Madrid on 6 May.

Stage 11
28 April 1984 — Burgos to Santander,

Stage 12
29 April 1984 — Santander to Lagos de Covadonga,

Stage 13
30 April 1984 — Cangas de Onís to Oviedo,

Stage 14
1 May 1984 — Lugones to Monte Naranco,  (ITT)

Stage 15
2 May 1984 — Oviedo to León,

Stage 16
3 May 1984 — León to Valladolid,

Stage 17
4 May 1984 — Valladolid to Segovia,

Stage 18a
5 May 1984 — Segovia to Torrejón de Ardoz,

Stage 18b
5 May 1984 — Torrejón de Ardoz to Torrejón de Ardoz,  (ITT)

Stage 19
6 May 1984 — Torrejón de Ardoz to Madrid,

References

1984 Vuelta a España
Vuelta a España stages